Sacral crest may refer to:

 Lateral sacral crest
 Medial sacral crest
 Median sacral crest